Winchester Town Hall is a historic town hall at 71 Mount Vernon Street in Winchester, Massachusetts.  The -story brick building was built in 1887 to a design by Rand and Taylor.  It was funded in part by a bequest from William Parsons Winchester, for whom the town is named.  Stylistically the building has Queen Anne and Romanesque Revival styling.  Its most prominent feature is the clock tower, a four-plus story square tower topped by a pointed roof with gables.

The building was listed on the National Register of Historic Places in 1983, and included in the Winchester Center Historic District in 1986.

See also
National Register of Historic Places listings in Winchester, Massachusetts

References

City and town halls on the National Register of Historic Places in Massachusetts
Buildings and structures in Winchester, Massachusetts
Town halls in Massachusetts
Clock towers in Massachusetts
National Register of Historic Places in Winchester, Massachusetts
Historic district contributing properties in Massachusetts
1887 establishments in Massachusetts